All Saints Catholic College, Liverpool is an independent Roman Catholic co-educational secondary day school located in the south-western Sydney suburb of Liverpool, in New South Wales, Australia. The college was created in 2016 through the merger of the All Saints Catholic Boys' College and the All Saints Catholic Girls College and provides religious and general education for students in Year 7 to Year 10. The boys' school was originally called Patrician Brothers College, Liverpool. One of the feeder schools in the All Saints Catholic Primary School, located adjacent to the College.

The majority of the population of the college come from non-English-speaking backgrounds. The college caters for students in the parishes of Liverpool, Moorebank, Holsworthy and Lurnea. The school was founded by Brother Ignatius Barrett in 1954.

History
The college was founded in 1954 by Brother Ignatius Barrett as Patrician Brothers College, Liverpool. The school originally taught out of a partition-type shelter until the first buildings were constructed in 1955. The college continued to expand well into the 1970s. Upgrades to the administration and staff areas also took place in the 1990s. The name was officially changed to All Saints Catholic College in 1997. The logo, school colours and uniforms were changed as a result. In 2010, a new science block, funded by the Federal Government's Building Education Revolution Programme, was completed. Prior to its 2016 merger, the college comprised two single-sex colleges, running from years 7 through 10. In 2020, the school merged with All Saints Catholic Senior College in Casula and All Saints Catholic Primary School to form the first K-12 school in the archdiocese of Sydney. They adopted the motto 'Inspired by Christ', as well as the K-12 motto 'One school, dual campus, one community'

School structure and The Newman Program
Classes are structured into 5 periods, which last for one hour. These are broken every two hours by recess and lunch, which last 30 minutes. On Thursdays, classes are structured as 3 periods broken by recess and lunch, which is then followed by sports. The college ends 40 minutes earlier on Thursdays, compared to the rest of the week. Half of the subjects at the college are single-sex (core subjects). Core subjects include Mathematics, H.S.I.E, Science and English for years 7–8. Along with P.D.H.P.E also being added as a single-sex class in years 9-10 for students. Apart from single-sex classes, several elective and compulsive classes are taught co-educational with both genders learning together.

However, All Saints Catholic College also supports the Newman Gifted Education program for years 7-10. Students hoping to be in the Newman program undertake a selective exam in Year 6. Students can also join the Newman program later on from years 8–10 with outstanding grades. The Newman class is co-educational, meaning students in the Newman classes do not have any single-sex classes through high-school, different from other students.

Students in the Newman program are also included in a variety of special projects throughout the year such as The Newman Symposium. All teachers must complete a gifted education course before teaching the Newman class. Students in the Newman class are taught differently from other classes in order to fully reach the capabilities of gifted students. A spot in the Newman class is highly sought after for students and students should maintain high grades to secure their spot in the class.

The playground and all other areas of the school are shared by both female and male students with a Charity side, focusing on more passive activities during break times and a Patrician side, focusing on more active activities. The Charity side is known for being more popular to the Year Seven students, with many younger students spending their time on the Charity side. The Patrician side is well known for being the "sporty" area with many different options for students to exercise and play sports during break times. The Patrician Side is more popular to Year 8 students, with Year 9 and Year 10 students preferring to spend break times at the various courtyards and seating areas.

College homeroom/pastoral houses

Teresa House

Mother Mary Teresa was a woman who supported the poor in areas of India such as Calcutta. She was named as one of the new pastoral houses as part of the merging of All Saints in 2020

Patrick House

It is believed that Saint Patrick was born in Britain of Roman parents. At the age of sixteen, he was captured and taken to Ireland as a slave. He spent six years as a herdsman getting to know the language and way of life of his captors. During the many quiet times alone he came to a deep knowledge of God.

He escaped from Ireland, became a priest, then was consecrated a bishop. In 432 he returned to Ireland, where, filled with the Holy Spirit, he converted many Irish kings and their people. St. Patrick had a deeply spiritual and personal relationship with God, which allowed him to see  Christ in all people as expressed in 'The Breastplate'.

The Patrician Brothers derive their name from this saint as they were established as 'The Brothers of St. Patrick'.

Marum House

Aikenhead House

Mother Mary Frances Aikenhead (19 January 1787 – 22 July 1858) was born in Daunt's Square off Grand Parade, Cork, Ireland. She was the founder of the Catholic religious institute, the Religious Sisters of Charity, the Sisters of Charity of Australia, and of St. Vincent's Hospital in Dublin. She was active in works of charity but she had failed to find a religious institute devoted to charitable work. She shared this idea with Archbishop Murray, Bishop Coadjutor of Dublin who was a friend of O'Brien. Murray returned later and said that he would bring a French order to Ireland if Aikenhead would lead it.[6] To prepare for this task she became a novice from 1812 to 1815 in the Convent of the Institute of the Blessed Virgin at Micklegate Bar, York.[5] She there assumed the name she kept till death, Sister Mary Augustine. `

On 1 September 1815, the first members of the new institute took their vows, Sister Mary Augustine being appointed Superior-General. Added to the traditional three vows of poverty, chastity and obedience, was a fourth vow: to devote their lives to the service of the poor. The following sixteen years were filled with the arduous work of organizing the community and extending its sphere of labour to every phase of charity, chiefly hospital and rescue work.

She died in Dublin, aged 71, having left her institute in a flourishing condition, in charge of ten institutions, besides innumerable missions and branches of charitable work. She is interred in the cemetery attached to St. Mary Magdalen's, Donnybrook.

 Romero House

 Cahill House

Sports
The college takes part in the Metropolitan Catholic Schools competition (MCS) for male students, with the college taking place in Sydney Catholic Colleges Sports Association for girls representative Sport (SCC). Several colleges take part in this competition including Patrician Brothers, Fairfield and Blacktown and Holy Cross Ryde. All Saints students also participate in recreational sports such as ice skating, indoor rock climbing, ten-pin bowling, laser tag, golf, squash, tennis, table tennis, indoor soccer, indoor cricket, and indoor basketball, which are both in-school and out-of-school sports. As of 2020, All Saints competes in the MISA competition (Macarthur Independent Schools Association)

Recent developments
Recently the college undertook a refurbishment program to improve the school's facilities. This refurbishment was completed in 2014, which included general learning areas, TAS facilities, gym, library, synthetic surfaced turfed area, performing arts centre, and maths activity centre. New redevelopments, including a new administration block, staff study, and cafeteria are also planned.

Notable alumni
Michael Wenden
Anthony Minichiello
Giovanni Frangipane
Mitchell Duke

See also

 List of Catholic schools in New South Wales
 Catholic education in Australia

References

External links

School website (archive)

Catholic secondary schools in Sydney
1954 establishments in Australia
Educational institutions established in 1954
Liverpool, New South Wales